"Coming to America" is a song used in the movie Coming to America, starring Eddie Murphy. It was written by Nile Rodgers and Nancy Huang and performed by the American music band The System. The song played in the movie during the closing credits.

The song entered two Billboard charts in 1988, peaking No. 23 on the  Hot R&B/Hip-Hop Songs chart and No. 91 on the Hot 100 chart.

It was the last commercially successful single recorded by The System.

Track listing

Production
 Knut Bohn:  mixing
 Michael Hutchinson: mixing
 Knut Bohn: engineer

Chart performance

References

1988 singles
The System (band) songs
Songs written for films
Songs written by Nile Rodgers
Song recordings produced by Nile Rodgers
1988 songs
Atlantic Records singles
Coming to America (film series)